Emanuel Gyenes (born March 3, 1984 in Satu Mare, Romania) is a Romanian rally racing motorcycle rider of Hungarian ethnicity. He won the Malle Moto class in the 2020 Dakar Rally for bike competitors competing without any kind of assistance.

Dakar Rally results

Other results 
 Silver medal at the International Six Days Enduro 2007
 2nd place at 450 cc at the 2008 Central Europe Rally (held as a replacement for the canceled 2008 Dakar Rally)
 6th place in the overall classification in the Rallye des Pharaons 2008

References

External links 
 

1984 births
Living people
Sportspeople from Satu Mare
Dakar Rally motorcyclists
Romanian motorcycle racers
Off-road motorcycle racers
Romanian sportspeople of Hungarian descent